Be Still My Soul is an album by Abigail.

The album is a collection of hymns that Abigail enjoys.

"This album is different from anything I have ever done before. It is a departure from my previous styles of music but I haven't abandoned my club roots, and I'm still going to do a follow up to 'Home...again'. This is a snapshot of where I am right now. It has been a healing, cathartic experience for me."

Be Still My Soul is a collection of hymns, including "Amazing Grace", "How Great Thou Art" and "Be Still My Soul".

Abigail stated: "My hope for this collection of songs is to reach right into the heart of the listener and connect you to whatever that greater power is in your life. I wish for it to bring great comfort, healing, joy and peace."

Track listings
 It Is Well With My Soul
 How Great Thou Art
 Take My Life and Let It Be
 Be Still My Soul
 Great Is Thy Faithfulness
 Amazing Grace
 Come Thou Fount Of Every Blessing
 Be Thou My Vision
 This Is My Father's World
 Abide With Me

References

2010 albums
Abigail (singer) albums